Patrick O'Hare (1849–1917) was an Irish politician At the 1906 general election, he was elected to the House of Commons of the United Kingdom of Great Britain and Ireland as Member of Parliament (MP) for North Monaghan. He resigned his seat in 1907 by becoming Steward of the Manor of Northstead.

References

External links 

 

1849 births
1917 deaths
Irish Parliamentary Party MPs
UK MPs 1906–1910
Members of the Parliament of the United Kingdom for County Monaghan constituencies (1801–1922)
Irish Freemasons